The 1952 Santa Clara Broncos football team was an American football team that represented the University of Santa Clara as an independent during the 1952 college football season.  In their third season under head coach Richard F. Gallagher, the independent Broncos compiled a 2–6–1 record and were outscored 182 to 80. Their three home games were played off campus in San Francisco, Lodi, and Sacramento.

A month after the season ended, Rev. Herman J. Hauck, president of the university, announced on December 29 that the football program was being dropped. The state's other major college football programs at Catholic institutions, all NCAA independents, had recently been halted: Saint Mary's after the 1950 season and San Francisco and Loyola after 1951. Father Hauck stated that the football program had lost substantial money in the previous two seasons; other sources put the losses at $80,000 in 1952 and $72,000 in 1951.

By early 1954, there was already support for reviving the program, which returned for the 1959 season.

Schedule

References

Santa Clara
Santa Clara Broncos football seasons
Santa Clara Broncos football